The 1995 Dartmouth Big Green football team was an American football team that represented Dartmouth College during the 1995 NCAA Division I-AA football season. Dartmouth finished fourth in the Ivy League.

In their fourth season under head coach John Lyons, the Big Green compiled a 7–2–1 record and outscored opponents 221 to 137. Taran Lent and Peter Oberle were the team captains.

The Big Green's 4–2–1 conference record placed fourth in the Ivy League standings. Dartmouth outscored Ivy opponents 139 to 102.

Dartmouth played its home games at Memorial Field on the college campus in Hanover, New Hampshire.

Schedule

References

Dartmouth
Dartmouth Big Green football seasons
Dartmouth Big Green football